Bindi the Jungle Girl is an Australian children's television nature documentary series, presented by Bindi Irwin, the daughter of Steve and Terri Irwin. The series was produced and shot in Queensland by The Best Picture Show Company for Discovery Kids and the Australian Broadcasting Corporation.

The series aired from 9 June 2007 until 25 October 2008 on American networks Discovery Kids and simulcast on Animal Planet and on ABC1 in Australia from 18 July 2007.

The series also features Bindi's mother Terri, her younger brother Robert, and Steve Irwin's "best mate" and director of Australia Zoo, Wes Mannion. Bindi performs songs and dances with a group called the Crocmen, and answers questions from viewers in the "Bindi's Blog" segment.

Steve Irwin appeared in several episodes filmed prior to his death in 2006. The second series was produced after his death, but he appears in archive footage in a segment named "Croc Hunter Unplugged", generally spoken of transcendentally in the present tense.

Plot
Bindi Sue Irwin and her late father, "Crocodile Hunter" Steve Irwin, try to spread the idea of conservation by teaching the world about many different types of animals and explain why they are important.

Cast
 Bindi Irwin as herself
 Terri Irwin as herself
 Robert Irwin as himself
 Steve Irwin as himself
 Macaila Fernandes as Girl with Cat
 Dani Hagan as Hamster Care Educator
 Johnny Maio as Boy with Guinea Pigs

Episodes

Season One

Season Two

Related special
The series was introduced along with Bindi Irwin's first solo television program, My Daddy, the Crocodile Hunter, a documentary/memorial of Steve Irwin that aired on Animal Planet. It also talked about Bindi and her blooming career.

Merchandise
Australia Zoo produce an extensive range of Bindi merchandise including Bindi dolls, bracelets, stickers and clothes.

Bindi Wear is an exclusive range of children's clothes designed by Melanie Berry and Palmina Distasi. The clothing range features a collection of shirts, shorts, skirts and accessories for young girls and boys. The Bindi Wear concept is developed and managed by Steve's sister, Joy Muscillo.

Bindi Wear International is a range of apparel, footwear and accessories designed for children up to the age of 10 years. Designers, The 3 Monsters, have worked closely with Australia Zoo to ensure the clothing range upholds the Irwin's strong conservation beliefs and values.

DVD releases

The complete series has been released by ABC (Australia) on PAL Region 4 DVD.

References

External links 
 

2007 Australian television series debuts
2008 Australian television series endings
2000s children's television series
2000s documentary television series
Australian Broadcasting Corporation original programming
Australian children's education television series
Australian non-fiction television series
English-language television shows
Television series about animals
Television series about children
Television shows set in Queensland
Discovery Kids original programming
Steve Irwin